Nick Robinson is an English actor who has appeared regularly on British television, most famously as William Beech in Goodnight Mister Tom, starring John Thaw. He also played the lead in the television series Harry and the Wrinklies based upon the book of the same name by Alan Temperley, produced by Scottish Television. He has made a few other television programmes including an episode of Midsomer Murders and he was also in the film version of Tom's Midnight Garden. Other appearances include Ruth Rendell Mysteries, Urban Gothic and Down to Earth.

Career
He began his career in theatre and, at the age of 7, appeared in the West End transfer of An Inspector Calls, produced by the National Theatre, at the Aldwych Theatre. His next appearance was in Theatre De Complicite's production of The Caucasian Chalk Circle in the Olivier Theatre and on its national tour. He later played the title role in the Royal Shakespeare Company's production of Little Eyolf, directed by Adrian Noble.

Robinson was most famous for his role in Goodnight Mister Tom. This won the awards of the Bafta for the Most Popular TV programme in 1998 voted for by readers of the Radio Times, Best Drama performance in 1999 and the Best ITV/Channel 5 Programme of 1998.

Robinson also works extensively as a producer; most recently he presented the UK premiere production of Rodgers and Hammerstein's State Fair directed by Thom Southerland, at the Trafalgar Studios in London's West End. Other credits include The Full Monty at the New Players Theatre, Calamity Jane at Upstairs at the Gatehouse, Singin' in the Rain at the Broadway Studio, Call Me Madam at Upstairs at the Gatehouse and The Unsinkable Molly Brown at the Landor Theatre. Later this year, Robinson will be producing the Pulitzer prize-winning play The Diary of Anne Frank.

Filmography
Goodnight Mister Tom (TV movie, 1998) as William Beech
Tom's Midnight Garden (1999) as Peter Long
Midsomer Murders (TV series) as Felix Bryce in episode Death's Shadow (1999)
Harry and the Wrinklies (TV series, 1999–2002) as Harry
Vatel (2000) as Colin
Ruth Rendell Mysteries (TV series) as Edward Devenish in episode Harm Done (2000)
Urban Gothic (TV series) as Jake in episode Old Nick (2000)
Ali and Danny (2002) as Danny 
Down to Earth (TV series) as Ronan Davies in episode Moving On (2003)

Personal life 
Robinson became engaged to Big Brother 2016 star Andy West on 25 December 2018.

References

External links

Living people
English male film actors
English male television actors
People from Peterborough
English male stage actors
English gay actors
Male actors from Cambridgeshire
English theatre managers and producers
1986 births